Antoine Kesia-Mbe Mindua is a Congolese lawyer who is currently a judge of the International Criminal Court. He was previously a judge of the International Criminal Tribunal for the former Yugoslavia.

Education
Mindua studied law and political science in Kinshasa, Nancy-Université, Strasbourg and Geneva. He received his doctorate in international law from the University of Geneva in 1995.

Career
Mindua served first as a Legal Officer and Chief of the Judicial Proceedings Support Unit at the International Criminal Tribunal for Rwanda in Arusha from 1996 to 2001. He was also ambassador of the Democratic Republic of the Congo to Switzerland in Bern and Permanent Representative to the United Nations Office at Geneva from 2001 to 2006. During his tenure in Geneva, Mindua held a number of multilateral posts, including Vice-Chairman of the Executive Committee of the Programme of the United Nations High Commissioner for Refugees, Chairman of the Group of 77 (G77) and China, and Coordinator of the Group of 21 at the United Nations Conference on Disarmament.

Mindua later served as a Trial Judge at the International Criminal Tribunal for the former Yugoslavia in The Hague from 2006 to 2015.

Within the ICC, Kesia-Mbe chaired the Pre-Trial Division from 2018 until 2019. In 2018, he was assigned to consider the request of prosecutor Fatou Bensouda for the ICC to rule on whether it has jurisdiction over the deportations of Rohingya people from Myanmar to Bangladesh. Also in 2018, he presided over hearings of Alfred Yekatom, a former militia leader accused of alleged atrocities against Muslims in the Central African Republic. In 2020, he was part of the three-member panel who judged that former Congolese vice president and militia leader Jean-Pierre Bemba, who had been acquitted of war crimes by the court in 2018, was not entitled to any damages or compensation for his 10-year stint in the United Nations Detention Unit (UNDU).

Other activities
Mindua is also a professor at the Universities of Kinshasa and Geneva. He teaches public international law and international criminal law.

He is a member of the Crimes Against Humanity Initiative Advisory Council, a project of the Whitney R. Harris World Law Institute at Washington University School of Law in St. Louis to establish the world's first. treaty on the prevention and punishment of crimes against humanity.

References

International Criminal Court judges
Living people
Year of birth missing (living people)
Place of birth missing (living people)
Democratic Republic of the Congo judges
Democratic Republic of the Congo diplomats
International Criminal Tribunal for the former Yugoslavia judges
Democratic Republic of the Congo judges of United Nations courts and tribunals
Democratic Republic of the Congo judges of international courts and tribunals
21st-century Democratic Republic of the Congo people
University of Geneva alumni